New York Central Railroad Tugboat 13 was a railway tugboat built in 1887 in Camden, New Jersey by John H. Dialogue and Son. The tugboat was built for the New York Central Railroad to push barges, called car floats, carrying railroad cars and other freight across the waterways of New York Harbor.

The engines sat back-to-back and drove a central Falk gearbox, which turned the single propeller.

The hull was riveted and made of wrought iron.

After 2002, the tugboat underwent extensive renovation at Garpo Marine in Tottenville, Staten Island. Two new keel coolers from Fernstrum were installed in a recessed box in the hull to cool the engines.

Efforts to restore the ship seemingly failed in the intervening years, and she was scrapped in 2017 in Tottenville.

Other vessels built by John H. Dialogue and Son
  at the San Francisco Maritime Museum, hull number 204801. 
Susan Elizabeth (1886) launched as C. C. Clark and briefly served as New York Central No. 3.  This boat was broken up in the fall of 2008 in the same yard in Tottenville, Staten Island, New York where Tugboat 13 was being restored.
Elise Anne Connors (1881)

Photos

See also

References

External links
 
 

New York Central Railroad
Tugboats of the United States
1887 ships
Ships built by Dialogue & Company